María Laura Ábalo (born 14 August 1981) is an Argentine rower. She competed at the 2007,2011 and 2015 Pan American Games.

At the 2012 Summer Olympics, she competed in the Women's coxless pair with Gabriela Best. At the Pan American Games, Laura won two gold medals in 2011 and a bronze medal in 2007 and 2015.

References

1981 births
Living people
Pan American Games gold medalists for Argentina
Argentine female rowers
Olympic rowers of Argentina
Rowers at the 2012 Summer Olympics
Rowers at the 2011 Pan American Games
Rowers at the 2015 Pan American Games
Pan American Games bronze medalists for Argentina
Pan American Games medalists in rowing
Medalists at the 2007 Pan American Games
Medalists at the 2011 Pan American Games
Medalists at the 2015 Pan American Games
21st-century Argentine women